The CWFH Heritage Tag Team Championship was a tag team championship controlled by Championship Wrestling from Hollywood.

Natural Selection (Brian Cage and Shaun Ricker) defeated RockNES Monsters (Johnny Yuma and Johnny Goodtime) in the finals of a tournament to become the Mach One Wrestling Tag Team Champions. Then the name was later changed to the NWA Heritage Tag Team Championships when they joined the NWA Territory. After departing from the NWA, the name was formally changed to the "CWFH Heritage Tag Team Championships"

Reigns

List of combined reigns

By team

By wrestler

See also
UWN Tag Team Championship

External links
Wrestling titles

National Wrestling Alliance championships
Tag team wrestling championships
Regional professional wrestling championships
2010 establishments in California
2015 disestablishments in California
United Wrestling Network championships